Events in the year 1849 in Brazil.

Incumbents
Monarch – Pedro II.
Prime Minister – Viscount of Olinda (until 8 October), Marquis of Monte Alegre (starting 8 October).

Events

Births
 5 November - Ruy Barbosa

Deaths

 3 December - Urânia Vanério

References

 
1840s in Brazil
Years of the 19th century in Brazil
Brazil
Brazil